Tinsukia district is one of the 34 administrative districts in the state of Assam, India. The district headquarters is located at Tinsukia city. The district occupies an area of 3790 km2.

Towns
Digboi
Doomdooma
Jagun
Kakopathar
Lido Town
Makum
Margherita
Sadiya
Tinsukia

History 
The area of the present district was an integral part of the Chutiya kingdom during the medieval period. After the defeat of the Chutias, the Ahoms placed Sadiya-khowa gohain to rule the region. Later, the Matak kingdom rose in its place after the Moamoria rebellion. The older name of Tinsukia city was Bengmara. It was later made the capital of the Motok Kingdom when a member of the former Chutia royal family named Sarbananada Singha established his capital at Rangagarh situated in the bank of river Guijan. In 1791 AD, he transferred his capital to the city of Bengmara. Bengmara was built by King Sarbananda Singha with the help of his Minister, Gopinath Barbaruah (alias Godha). The city was built in the middle of the present city of Tinsukia. It was declared the 23rd district of Assam on 1 October 1989 when it was split from Dibrugarh.

Several tanks were dug in the days of Sarbananda Singha viz. Chauldhuwa Pukhuri, Kadamoni pukhuri, Da Dharua Pukhuri, Mahdhuwa Pukhuri, Bator Pukhuri, Logoni Pukhuri, Na-Pukhuri, Devi Pukhuri, Kumbhi Pukhuri, and Rupahi Pukhuri.

Apart from these ponds, there are many ancient roads constructed in different parts of the Muttack territory. Godha-Borbaruah road, Rangagarah road, Rajgor road, and Hatiali road were main roads within the territory.

In 1823, the British first discovered tea plants in Sadiya and the first tea plantation was started in Chabua near Tinsukia. The name Chabua comes from "Chah-Buwa"/tea plantation.

In 1882, the Dibru–Sadiya Railway was opened to traffic by the Assam Railway & Trading Company, centred on Tinsukia, and a turning point in the economic development of north-east India.

Economy 
Tinsukia is an industrial district of Assam. The Oldest oil refinery in India is situated at Digboi and places like Margherita and Ledo are famous for open cast coal mining. It is one of the most important tea-growing and processing districts in the country. Thereby, Tinsukia district has a long history of extractive industries spanning tea, coal, oil, timber, and plywood. The timber and plywood industries was halted by the Supreme Court of India when it imposed a blanket ban in 1996. Sociologist Sanjay Barbora and Geologist Sarat Phukan who grew up in eastern Assam assert, Three crucial industrial activities – tea plantations, oil drilling sites, and collieries – that epitomised 19th and 20th century colonialism, are layered into this energised landscape.Tinsukia is one of the premier commercial centres in Assam. It is an industrial district, yet it produces a sizeable amount of tea, oranges, ginger, other citrus fruits and paddy (rice). The district also has a cosmetic plant of Hindustan Unilever (HUL).

Transport 
Tinsukia is well connected by airway, national highway and railway. It is 532 km by road from Dispur, the state capital of Assam. The nearest airport is Dibrugarh Airport which is about 40 km from Tinsukia with daily connection from Delhi/Guwahati and Kolkata. The New Tinsukia railway station connects Tinsukia with the rest of the country.

Health care Institutions

Public hospitals 

 Civil Hospital
 ESIS Hospital

Private hospitals 

 City Hospital & Research Center
 Deys Nursing Home
 Borthakur Nursing Home
 RC Agarwal Memorial Hospital
 Saint Lukes Hospital
 Jeewan Jyoti Nursing Home
 Swastik Nursing Home
 Pinewood Hospital
 Biroja Hospital
 Lifeline Hospital

Demographics
According to the 2011 census Tinsukia district has a population of 1,327,929, roughly equal to the nation of Mauritius or 4.22 percent of the total population of Assam. This gives it a ranking of 371st in India (out of a total of 640). Its population growth rate over the decade 2001-2011 was 14.51%. Tinsukia has a sex ratio of 948 females for every 1000 males, and a literacy rate of 70.92%. Scheduled Castes and Tribes made up 2.84% and 6.18% of the population respectively.

Hindus were 1,181,347 (88.96%), Christians 76,877 (5.79%), Muslims 40,000 (3.64%) as of 2011. The majority are Assamese. There are also other immigrant communities like Bihari and Bengali.

Tinisukia is a multi cultural district. According to the 2011 census, 47.81% of the population spoke Assamese, 14.1% Sadri, 10.21% Bengali, 8.54% Hindi, 7.51% Nepali, 2.3% Bhojpuri, 2.11% Odia and 1.46% Mising as their first language. Several other languages are spoken in Tinsukia district such as Khamti and Tai Phake.

Culture
 Bihu
 Durga Puja
 Kali Puja
 Karam
 Tusu Festival
 Chhath Puja
 Ali Ai Ligang
 Moran Bihu
 Medam Mephi

Tourism 

Dibru Saikhowa National Park is famous for birds and is a biodiversity hotspot with over 350 species of avifauna providing unique habitat for globally threatened species. A safe haven for extremely rare white-winged wood duck and many migratory birds. Its feral horses are precisely sufficient to make the visitor wild.

Dehing Patkai Wildlife Sanctuary is one of the last remaining lowland tropical wet evergreen forests of Assam. It spreads over an area of 300 km2. in the southern and eastern parts of the district. It is home to various types of wildlife like the hoolock gibbon, pig-tailed macaque, slow loris, tiger, elephant, clouded leopard, and hornbill.

Places of interest
Digboi
 Digboi boasts of two modern wonders of the world – a hundred-year-old oil field still producing and the world’s oldest operating oil refinery. Tucked amid blue hills and undulating plains carpeted with emerald green tea plantations, Digboi still retains its colonial ambiance. It’s simply breathtaking to have a bird’s eye view of Digboi from the famous Ridge Hill point. On clear days, one can also see the snow-covered mountains of the eastern Himalayas.
National Oil Park
 Digboi also has an oil museum and a wildlife sanctuary of unsurpassed beauty. Going down the hill, visitors will come across oil derricks of various types and other devices still declaring the glory and marvel of the now outdated innovations of the last forties. If one comes down from the hill on the other side, one will have the greatest sight of his lifetime. One may also bump across a herd of elephants or a Royal Bengal Tiger, besides some rare species of birds.
War Cemetery
 The most dramatic event in Digboi’s history took place during the World War II when the belligerent Japanese came close to within three days marching distance of Digboi. These images come back as one kneels at the headstones at the Digboi War Cemetery.
Margherita
 The centre of tea gardens, plywood factories, and coal mines, with many picnic spots dotting the sandy banks of the River Dihing. Cool, misty and away from the mainland, breathing in the aroma of fresh tea leaves is an experience, both rare and heartwarming. The tea gardens here are perhaps the best in the world.
Sports
 The 18-hole golf course developed by the Scottish pioneers in their immutable style. In fact, Digboi can almost be called a Golfing Resort with as many as eight golf courses within close proximity, each with its own individual character and challenges.

Flora and fauna
It shares the park with Dibrugarh district.

See also
Moran Autonomous Council

References

External links

 District Administration website

 
Districts of Assam
1989 establishments in Assam